Billboard Top R&B Records of 1957 is made up of two year-end charts compiled by Billboard magazine ranking the year's top rhythm and blues records based on record sales and disc jockey plays.  Due to the extent of cross-over between the R&B and pop charts in 1957, the song's rank, if any, in the year-end pop chart is also provided.

See also
List of Billboard number-one R&B songs of 1957
Billboard year-end top 50 singles of 1957
1957 in music

References

1957 record charts
Billboard charts
1957 in American music